Noreen Motamed is an Iranian-American artist and painter, residing in Maryland.

Biography 
Daughter of linguist, Fereydoun Motamed. She was born in Abadan, Iran and attended primary and secondary school in Tehran and graduated from University of Tehran with a Bachelor of Arts degree in Arts. She continued her postgraduate studies and once again graduated in first place from Alzahra University with a Master of Arts degree with concentration in painting.

She began painting as a professional artist in 1983. Starting with a figurative art style she then turned to abstract work, often depicting abstracted Persian female rug weavers and kilim weavers or humans and nature. Persian miniatures have been great sources of inspiration in her latest paintings. She has continued this style while in the United States with a western influence as it appears in some of her abstract figurative 2 collection.

See also

 Islamic art
 Iranian art
 Islamic calligraphy
 List of Iranian artists

References

Bibliography 
 "Iranian Women Artists: Guity Novin, Sara Rahbar, Noreen Motamed, Sara Shamsavari, Mansooreh Hosseini, Mokarrameh Ghanbari, Iran Darroudi", (2010)

External links
Noreen Motamed's website
Noreen's Youtube Sideshow Videos
Voice of America (VOA) TV, Persian Interview with Noreen Motamed about her paintings at Seyhoun Gallery, from 2008

1967 births
Living people
20th-century Iranian women artists
21st-century Iranian women artists
Iranian women painters
People from Abadan, Iran
Al-Zahra University alumni
American artists of Iranian descent